Emilio Aragón may refer to:
Emilio Aragón Bermúdez (1929–2012), also known as Miliki, Spanish clown, accordionist and singer
Emilio Aragón Álvarez (born 1959), also known as Milikito, son of Miliki, Spanish actor, presenter, musician and producer